Andriy Andriyovych (or Andrei Andreyevich) Biba (born 10 August 1937) is a retired Ukrainian football player and coach.

Career
Biba's first team was Kiev's Iskra, coached by Vladimir Balakin. Soon FSHM opened in Kyiv, where Balakin went and took a number of Iskra players with him. In 1957, Oleg Oshenkov took him to Dynamo Kyiv. Soon Biba made his debut for the main team - went to the match against "Zenith" in Leningrad (2: 2) and scored a goal. He played for Dynamo Kyiv (1957-1967), Dnipro (1968-1969), and Desna Chernihiv (1970). He played 246 matches in the Soviet Top League and scored 69 goals. Scored the first goal of Soviet clubs in European Cups (Cup Winners' Cup) "Coleraine" (Northern Ireland) - "Dynamo" (Kiev) - 1: 6. In 1967, after reaching the age of 30, he was forced to leave Dynamo Kyiv. At first he thought he would be a coach, but soon realized that he still had the strength to play. He spent two seasons at Dnipro. In 1970 he moved to Desna Chernihiv in Football Championship of the Ukrainian SSR.

International career
Biba played his only game for the USSR on 4 July 1965 in a friendly against Brazil starring Pelé.  Biba appeared on the field only in the 2nd half and played 30 minutes.

After retirement
From 1972 he worked in the coaching staff of Kiev "Dynamo". Among his merits is the invitation to Kiev of Viktor Kolotov from Rubin. In different years he worked in the coaching staff of such clubs as "Tavria" (Simferopol), "Dnepr" (Dnepropetrovsk). He coached "Spartak" (Zhytomyr), "Ugolek" (Gorlovka), "Podolye" (Khmelnytsky), "Neftyanik" (Akhtyrka), "Khimik" (Zhytomyr). Senior coach of the Football Federation of Ukraine - 1982, 1984-1986 (June), 1990-1993, June. He was the head of the team of veterans "Dynamo" (Kiev). Currently coach-coach of Kiev "Dynamo", president of the Ukrainian club "Leather Ball".

Playmaker
Biba is acknowledged as one of the greatest attacking midfielders Eastern Europe has ever produced. As Guardian journalist Jonathan Wilson explains, he functioned as 'Bobby Charlton did in Alf Ramsey's England side' as an advanced attacking midfielder moving the ball around the attacking third with a howitzer shot. He enjoyed a starring role in the Dynamo Kyiv team of Victor Maslov.

Honours
 Soviet Top League winner: 1961, 1966, 1967.
 Soviet Cup winner: 1964, 1966.
 Soviet Footballer of the Year: 1966.

References

External links
 
 
 
 Profile 

1937 births
Living people
Footballers from Kyiv
Soviet footballers
Ukrainian footballers
Soviet Union international footballers
Soviet Top League players
FC Dynamo Kyiv players
FC Dnipro players
FC Desna Chernihiv players
Soviet football managers
Ukrainian football managers
FC Polissya Zhytomyr managers
FC Podillya Khmelnytskyi managers
FC Naftovyk Okhtyrka managers
FC Shakhtar Horlivka managers
Association football midfielders